Bliss is a British television science thriller series first broadcast on 11 October 1995. It ran for a total of five episodes on ITV1. The series starred Simon Shepherd as Dr. Sam Bliss, a medical research scientist based at Cambridge University, and widowed father-of-two, who often finds himself investigating bizarre and unexplained deaths, with the help of his assistant, Dr. Melanie Kilpatrick (Sian Webber). Initially broadcast as a single stand-alone pilot episode in 1995, Bliss spawned a run of four episodes, which followed in 1997.

The initial pilot was directed by Marc Evans and written by novelist Michael Stewart. Jonathan Hyde, Reece Dinsdale and Jennifer Hilary co-starred in the pilot, alongside Sarah Smart and Zoë Hart, who later reprised their roles for the series. The initial pilot drew a viewing audience of approximately 10 million, while viewing figures for the series averaged around 7 million. In 2000, both the pilot episode and series were released on VHS via Carlton Television. Neither the pilot episode, nor the series, have been released on DVD.

Cast
 Simon Shepherd as Dr. Sam Bliss (Pilot — All Fall Down)
 Sian Webber as Dr. Melanie Kilpatrick (Pilot — All Fall Down)
 Sarah Smart as Zoe Bliss (Pilot — All Fall Down)
 Zoë Hart as Louise Bliss (Pilot — All Fall Down)
 Anthony Smee as Dr. Graham Fairfax (In Memoriam — All Fall Down)
 Jonathan Hyde as Dr. Oliver Pleasance (Pilot)
 Reece Dinsdale as Dr. Clive Sussman (Pilot)
 Eva Marie Bryer as Serena Snowden (Pilot)
 Jennifer Hilary as Tamara Bancroft (Pilot)
 John Normington as Albert Fowler (Pilot)
 Deborah Norton as Dorothy Snowden (Pilot)
 Peter Penry-Jones as Jeffrey Snowden (Pilot)
 Kate Buffery as Dr. Gaynor Hands (Pilot, Enemy Within)
 Sophie Stanton as DC Paula White (Pilot, Enemy Within)
 Scot Williams as Geoff Croft (Pilot, In Memoriam)

Episodes

Pilot (1995)

Series (1997)

References

External links
 

1995 British television series debuts
1997 British television series endings
1990s British crime television series
1990s British drama television series
ITV television dramas
1990s British television miniseries
English-language television shows
Carlton Television
Television series by ITV Studios
Films directed by Marc Evans